Calochortus plummerae is a species of mariposa lily known by the common name Plummer's mariposa lily.

It is endemic to Southern California where it is found along the coast, inland hills, and some Transverse Ranges and Peninsular Ranges.<ref name="cnps">[http://www.rareplants.cnps.org/detail/1599.html California Native Plant Society—CNPS Inventory Plant Detail: 'Calochortus plummerae]. Retrieved 9 February 2013.</ref>  It is a member of the chaparral, grasslands, and lower montane coniferous forest plant communities.

The species is named in honor of American botanist Sara Plummer Lemmon (1836 – 1923).

DescriptionCalochortus plummerae''  produces thin, branching stems and a few long curling leaves.

Atop the stem is a lily bloom with long, pointed sepals and petals which may be up to 4 centimeters long. The petals are pink, lavender, or white with a wide yellow band across the middle. They are hairy inside and sometimes fringed with hairs. The center contains large whitish or yellowish anthers. Flowers are present from May to July.

The fruit capsule is up to 8 centimeters long.

References

External links
 Jepson Manual Treatment — Calochortus plummerae
United States Department of Agriculture Plants Profile: Calochortus plummerae (Plummer's mariposa lily)
Calochortus plummerae — Calphotos, University of California @ Berkeley Photos gallery

plummerae
Endemic flora of California
Flora of the Sierra Nevada (United States)
Natural history of the California chaparral and woodlands
Natural history of the Peninsular Ranges
Natural history of the Santa Monica Mountains
Natural history of the Transverse Ranges
Plants described in 1890